Saint-Nazaire-de-Dorchester is a parish municipality of 400 people in the Bellechasse Regional County Municipality, Quebec, part of the Chaudière-Appalaches administrative region. It is the least populous municipality in Bellechasse.

Demographics 

References

Parish municipalities in Quebec
Incorporated places in Chaudière-Appalaches